The 1941 Little All-America college football team is composed of college football players from small colleges and universities who were selected by the Associated Press (AP) as the best players at each position. For 1941, the AP selected first, second, and third teams.

First team
B - Marv Tommervik, Pacific Lutheran
B - Noble Smith, Hawaii
B - James Jones, Union (TN)
B - Jack Hunt, Marshall
E - Henry Stanton, Arizona
E - Mike Yurcheshen, Case
T - Dick Moe, Colorado Mines
T - Ed Kromka, Missouri Mines
G - Nick George, Waynesburg
G - Garland Gregory, Louisiana Tech
C - Stuart Clarkson

Second team
B - Owen Price, Texas Mines
B - Milt Jannone, Hamilton
B - Virgil Wagner, Millikin
B - Jim Carrier, Wesleyan
E - Jim Fitzharris, St. Thomas
E - Charles Schuster, Eastern Kentucky
T - Tom Barber, Chattanooga
T - George Watts, Appalachian State
G - Anthony Jo Fraiola, Willamette
G - Albert Will, Trinity (CT)
C - Ray Satterlee, Eastern Washington

Third team
 B - Ben Collins, West Texas State 
 B - Doug Rehor, Dickinson
 B - Jim Tarrant, Howard (AL)
 B - Tony Colella, Canisius
 E - Roland Warren, Howard Payne
 E - Bob Metzger, Western Michigan
 T - Paul Newell, Kearney
 T - Tony Macikas, Cincinnati
 G - Steve Vucic, St. Vincent
 G - Louis Gonias, Grinnell
 C - Ed Ellis, Catawba

See also
 1941 College Football All-America Team

References

Little All-America college football team
Little All-America college football teams